Corte Madera Creek (Spanish for "a place where wood is cut") is a  creek that flows north-northwest to Searsville Dam and then joins with Bear Creek to form San Francisquito Creek in California.

History
Historically Corte de Madera Creek ran through the Rancho Cañada del Corte de Madera and Rancho Corte de Madera land grants (the latter surrounding the former).

Ecology
Corte Madera Creek was historically an anadromous steelhead (Oncorhynchus mykiss irideus) spawning stream; however, access to the creek has been blocked since 1890 by Searsville Dam. Although steelhead can no longer run above Searsville Dam to spawn, stream resident coastal rainbow trout (O. m. irideus) populations live in upper Corte Madera Creek and its tributaries. In a 1996 biotic assessment of upper Searsville Lake and the lower floodplain of Corte Madera Creek, Stanford biologists wrote that the native species likely included steelhead/coastal rainbow trout (Oncorhynchus mykiss irideus), sculpin, California roach (Hesperoleucas symmetricus), hitch (Lavinia exilcauda), speckled dace (Rhinichthys osculus), Sacramento sucker (Catostomus occidentalis), Pacific lamprey (Entosphenus tridentatus), and perhaps three-spined stickleback (Gasterosteus aculeatus), Sacramento pikeminnow (Ptychocheilus grandis), Sacramento blackfish (Orthodon microlepidontus), and coho salmon (Oncorhynchus kisutch). They noted that the only native species observed with any regularity in the study area are Sacramento sucker and rainbow trout, and attributed the now depauperate native fish fauna to dislocation of hydrologic connectivity due to the dam, transformation of the habitat above the dam from lotic to lentic, and the fact that Searsville Reservoir harbors many non-native species of centrarchid fishes (sunfish, black bass, and crappie) which prey on virtually all historically native fishes. They noted that federally threatened California red-legged frogs (Rana draytonii) occur in the lotic portions of Corte Madera Creek below the dam but not above, likely due to depredation by non-native fish and American bullfrogs (Lithobates catesbeiana).

The extent by which Searsville Reservoir serves as a source for non-native species was illustrated when Stanford biologists studied the aquatic fauna found in the plunge pool below the Searsville dam spillway. The plunge pool was drained in 2013 to allow for a safety inspection of the base of the dam. Native species found when the plunge pool was pumped dry include two steelhead trout, 26 California roach and 22 Sacramento suckers. In contrast, more than 1,500 non-native fishes were encountered during the dewatering process, including over 500 sunfish including green sunfish ((Lepomis cyanellus), bluegill (Lepomis macrochirus) and likely redear sunfish (Lepomis microlophus), two bullhead catfish (Ameiurus species) and over 1,000 mosquitofish (Gambusia affinis). Other non-native in the plunge pool included 500 bullfrogs and 150 Louisiana red swamp crayfish.

In the spring of 1991, an adult steelhead (0.74m) was observed jumping at the base of Searsville Dam. In May 2002, the San Francisquito Watershed Council released a barrier survey including Corte Madera Creek. A private bridge apron adjacent to Willowbrook Drive and another downstream of the confluence with Damiani Creek were described as impassable barriers to upstream migrating steelhead. In 2014 a systematic study of 1,400 plus dams in California identified Searsville Dam as a high-priority candidate to improve environmental flows for native fish conservation.

Illegal fishing of rainbow trout (stream resident forms of  O. m. irideus) has occurred in several places along Corte Madera Creek with significant damage to the surviving populations of native rainbows. In addition, there are also several private ponds stocked with warm water non-native species, such as Smallmouth Bass, Redear Sunfish and Bluegill that threaten the surviving native trout population fry and eggs. The most notable pond is on Iroquois Trail and empties into Corte Madera Creek through a single outlet which floods during El Niño, or a wet winter.

Watershed
Corte Madera Creek has its origin just northeast of Borel Hill in the Coal Creek Open Space Preserve (part of the Midpeninsula Regional Open Space District, and follows Alpine Road northwesterly along the San Andreas Fault to pick up Coal Creek, Rengstorff Gulch, Damiani Creek, Jones Gulch, Hamms Gulch - all draining the northeastern slope of the Santa Cruz Mountains. It levels out upon reaching Portola Valley and crosses under Portola Road at Brookside Drive. Before reaching Searsville Reservoir it arrives in a  large laguna or freshwater marsh formed by the nexus of several creeks, including Westbridge Creek, Sausal Creek, Dennis Martin Creek, and Alambique Creek.

Just south of the intersection of Mountain Home Road and Portola Road, Alambique Creek enters a historic wetland pond (Lloyd's Pond) which is currently impounded by the road-fill of Portola Road and a culvert. From there Alambique Creek flows under Portola Road into the upper Searsville Reservoir at its confluence with Sausal Creek. Dennis Martin Creek flows into Sausal Creek just upstream of the reservoir area at the Family Farm Road bridge. From there Sausal Creek joins enters Searsville Reservoir. Corte Madera Creek enters Searsville Reservoir further to the east. Old maps suggest that Dennis Martin Creek and Alambique Creek were historically tributary to Sausal Creek. This unique confluence of streams and natural wetlands was submerged and buried with sediment due to the construction of Searsville Dam and the siltation of the reservoir.

Below Searsville Dam Corte Madera Creek joins with Bear Creek to form San Francisquito Creek.

See also
List of watercourses in the San Francisco Bay Area
Searsville Dam
San Francisquito Creek

References

External links
San Francisquito Watershed & Alluvial Fan at Oakland Museum of California website
Oakland Museum Map of San Francisquito Creek Watershed
Beyond Searsville Dam
San Francisquito Watershed Council

Rivers of San Mateo County, California
Palo Alto, California
Santa Cruz Mountains
Rivers of Northern California
Tributaries of San Francisquito Creek